Melodifestivalen 2013 was the Swedish music competition that selected the 53rd Swedish entry for the Eurovision Song Contest 2013. Robin Stjernberg's song "You" won the final, and became the first Second Chance song to win the Melodifestivalen final.

The final took place at the Friends Arena on 9 March 2013. For the twelfth consecutive year, the competition consisted of four semifinals, a "second chance" round, and a final. A total of 32 competing entries were divided into four semifinals, with eight compositions in each. From each semifinal, the songs that earned first and second place went directly to the final, while the songs that were placed third and fourth proceeded to the Second Chance semifinal. The bottom four songs in each semifinal were eliminated from the competition. This year the selection process for the 32 songs was slightly modified from the previous year by removing the web wildcard round and allowing the selection panel to decide on the finalist in the newcomer block of submissions. In addition, the winning artist of Svensktoppen nästa, a music competition organized by Sveriges Radio P4, automatically qualified to submit an entry for Melodifestivalen. Further changes included modification to the Second Chance round that removed one tier of duels.

Format 
Melodifestivalen 2013 was the twelfth consecutive year in which the competition took place in different cities across Sweden. The four semifinals were held in Karlskrona (2 February), Gothenburg (9 February), Skellefteå (16 February) and Malmö (23 February). The second chance round was held in Karlstad on 2 March while the final in Solna was held on 9 March. The final evening of the competition migrated to the newly built Friends Arena and for the first time since the creation of the current format, it did not take place at the Ericsson Globe.

In the semifinals, the winners were decided by the telephone and SMS votes of the viewers where the two entries with the most votes went directly to the final, while the third and fourth placed entries competed for another chance to get to the final in the Second Chance round. Of the eight songs that qualified to the Second Chance round, only two progressed to the final to complete the line-up of 10 finalists.

Schedule

Heats 

The four heats were held in Karlskrona, Gothenburg, Skellefteå and Malmö. A selection panel consisting of seven men and eight women ages 17–46 selected the finalists out of 2549 total submissions (1902 for the regular contest and 647 for the newcomer selection).

In 2012, Sveriges Radio announced that they would award a wildcard to the artist that wins Svensktoppen nästa, a music competition organized by Sveriges Radio P4, the following year. While all of the artists competing in this competition already had songs, the competition was scheduled to take place on 26 August 2012, which was before the 1 September 2012 cut off date for both Melodifestivalen and the Eurovision Song Contest. Therefore, the winning artist was required to submit a new song that would then be given a wildcard to compete in the competition. Terese Fredenwall ultimately won the competition and on 19 October, SVT announced that she would compete in Melodifestivalen with the song "Breaking the Silence".

For Melodifestivalen 2013, SVT decided to discontinue the Web Wildcard competition that was previously held between 2010 and 2012. Instead, an open selection was still held for unpublished and new artists to submit their entries, however, the selection panel that evaluates submissions for the regular contest would also evaluate these entries and select one which would receive a wildcard. On 17 October 2012, SVT announced that the song "Island" performed by Elin Petersson had been selected and would receive the wildcard.

On 19 November 2012, the first of two press conference was held to present the artists, songs, and composers for the competing entries in the first and second semifinals. Sandra Bjurman and Stefan Örn, two of the composers who wrote "Running Scared", the winning song of the Eurovision Song Contest 2011, were among the names.

On 26 November 2012, the second press conference was held to complete the line-up and present the remaining entries that would compete in the third and fourth semifinals.
Peter Boström and Thomas G:son, the composers of "Euphoria", the winning song of the Eurovision Song Contest 2012, both had several songs among the 32 entries.

On 3 January 2013, SVT announced the running order for each semifinal.

Heat 1 
The first heat was held on 2 February 2013 in Telenor Arena, Karlskrona. "Skyline" performed by David Lindgren and "Heartbreak Hotel" performed by Yohio qualified to the final, while the songs "Burning Flags" performed by Cookies 'N' Beans and "Vi kommer aldrig att förlora" performed by Eric Gadd qualified to the second chance round.

Heat 2 
The second heat was held on 9 February 2013 in Scandinavium, Gothenburg. "Copacabanana" performed by Sean Banan and "Only the Dead Fish Follow the Stream" performed by Louise Hoffsten qualified to the final, while the songs "Begging" performed by Anton Ewald and "Hello Goodbye" performed by Erik Segerstedt and Tone Damli qualified to the second chance round.

Heat 3 
The third heat was held on 16 February 2013 in Skellefteå Kraft Arena, Skellefteå."Falling" performed by State of Drama and "En riktig jävla schlager" performed by Ravaillacz qualified to the final, while the songs "In and Out of Love" performed by Martin Rolinski and "Hon har inte" performed by Caroline af Ugglas qualified to the second chance round.

Heat 4 
The fourth heat was held on 23 February 2013 in Malmö Arena, Malmö."Tell the World I'm Here" performed by Ulrik Munther and "Bed on Fire" performed by Ralf Gyllenhammar qualified to the final, while the songs "You" performed by Robin Stjernberg and "Jalla Dansa Sawa" performed by Behrang Miri qualified to the second chance round.

Second Chance 
The Andra Chansen (Second Chance) round was held on 2 March in Löfbergs Lila Arena, Karlstad.

The format for the Second Chance round underwent changes from the tournament concept introduced in 2007. The first round where the eight songs are paired into duels was removed in favour of two basic rounds of voting where all eight songs will compete against each other. All eight songs were performed one after the other in a producer determined draw like the preceding semifinals. After the first voting round, the top five compositions advanced and the bottom three were eliminated. The second round of voting narrowed the field down to the top four, eliminating the song that achieved fifth place. After the top four have been determined, the song that received the most votes in the previous voting rounds and the song that came in fourth were paired in a duel. The songs that came second and third were paired in another duel. The winning songs of these two duels progressed to the final. "Begging" performed by Anton Ewald and "You" performed by Robin Stjernberg qualified to the final.

First Round

Second Round

Final 
The final of Melodifestivalen 2013 took place on 9 March 2013 at the Friends Arena in Solna. The 10 songs that qualified for the finals had either achieved being the top two in their respective semifinal, or having qualified from the Second Chance round.

The winner was selected by a combination of public votes and 11 international jury groups. The public and the jury each had a total of 473 points to award. Each jury group awarded points as follows: 1, 2, 4, 6, 8, 10 and 12 points. The public vote was based on the percentage of votes each song had achieved. For example, if a song gained 10% of the public vote, then that entry would be awarded 10% of 473 points rounded to the nearest integer. In the event of a tie, the public vote would overrule the jury. Robin Stjernberg was the winner with the song "You" after gaining the most points overall from the jury groups and achieving the second highest number of votes from the viewers.

Jury Spokespersons 
The spokespersons that read the jury votes were:

 Cyprus: Klitos Klitou
 Spain: Federico Llano-Sabugueiro
 Italy: Nicola Caligiore
 Iceland: Jónatan Gardarsson
 Malta: Chiara Siracusa
 Ukraine: Gina Dirawi
 Israel: Alon Amir
 France: Bruno Berberes
 United Kingdom: Simon Proctor
 Croatia: Aleksandar Kostadinov
 Germany: Torsten Amarell

Ratings

References

External links

Melodifestivalen Official Site 

Eurovision
2013
Eurovision Song Contest 2013
2013 in Swedish music
2013 song contests
February 2013 events in Europe
March 2013 events in Europe
Events at Malmö Arena
Events in Gothenburg
Events in Skellefteå
Events in Karlstad
Events in Karlskrona
2010s in Gothenburg
Events in Solna